This is a list of newspapers in Peru.

List of newspapers
Ajá - Lima
 
El Bocón - Lima; owned by conglomerate El Comercio Group
El Chino - Lima
El Comercio -  Lima; owned by conglomerate El Comercio Group
 
Cronicawan - Peru's first nationally circulated Quechua language newspaper
 
 - Lima; owned by conglomerate El Comercio Group
Diario del Cusco - Cusco
 - Lima
 
Gestion - Lima; owned by conglomerate El Comercio Group
 Hoy - Huánuco
 
 
 
Ojo - Lima; owned by conglomerate El Comercio Group
Perú 21; owned by conglomerate El Comercio Group
El Peruano
El Popular - Lima
 - Lima
La Razón - Lima
La República - Lima; a left-of-center newspaper
El Tiempo - Chiclayo
 
 
 Diario UNO
 Nuevo Sol

Defunct
 
 
 
 Mercurio Peruano
 Los Parias, 1904-1910
 , 1903-1984
 , est. 1919
 , 1950-1992
 
 La Voz de Chincha, est. 1924

See also
 Chicha press ("Prensa Chicha"; nickname for sensationalist tabloid newspapers)
 Media of Peru
List of newspapers
List of All Media in Peru
 Freedom of the press in Peru

References

This article incorporates information from the Spanish Wikipedia.

Further reading

External links
  (circa 2011)
 

Peru
Newspapers